Arvid Müller (2 April 1906 – 1 July 1964) was a Danish screenwriter. He wrote for 36 films between 1932 and 1965. He was born and died in Denmark.

Filmography

 Odds 777 (1932)
 Skal vi vædde en million? (1932)
 Tretten år (1932)
 Nyhavn 17 (1933)
 De blaa drenge (1933)
 Tag det som en mand (1941)
 Ballade i Nyhavn (1942)
 Baby på eventyr (1942)
 While the Attorney Is Asleep (1945)
 Brevet fra afdøde (1946)
 Far betaler (1946)
 Stjerneskud (1947)
 Op og ned langs kysten (1950)
 Min kone er uskyldig (1950)
 Alt dette og Island med (1951)
 Kvinnan bakom allt (1951)
 Rekrut 67 Petersen (1952)
 Den kloge mand (1956)
 Den store gavtyv (1956)
 Kispus (1956)
 Englen i sort (1957)
 Styrmand Karlsen (1958)
 Pigen og vandpytten (1958)
 Styrmand Karlsen (1958)
 Kærlighedens melodi (1959)
 Charles' tante (1959)
 Vi er allesammen tossede (1959)
 Kærlighedens melodi (1959)
 Den grønne elevator (1961)
 Støv på hjernen (1961)
 Sømænd og svigermødre (1962)
 Den kære familie (1962)
 Det støver stadig (1962)
 Den kære familie (1962)
 Tre piger i Paris (1963)
 Alt for kvinden (1964)
 Landmandsliv (1965)

External links

1906 births
1964 deaths
Danish male screenwriters
20th-century screenwriters
People from Copenhagen